GFH Financial Group, previously known as Gulf Finance House, is an Islamic investment bank with headquarters in Bahrain Financial Harbour, Bahrain.

One of its most notable investments is a 25% stake in the UK Football Premier League club Leeds United through their wholly owned subsidiary, Dubai-based GFH Capital, having initially acquired 100% ownership of the club from Ken Bates in December 2012.  On 7 February 2014 GFH Capital announced that they had exchanged contracts for the sale of Leeds to Massimo Cellino's family consortium 'Eleonora Sport Ltd'. The deal saw the Cellino family acquire a 75% ownership of the club in April 2014 after winning an appeal against the Football League's decision initially to block the sale.

History of GFH
GFH was established in the Kingdom of Bahrain in 1999 under a license granted by the Central Bank of Bahrain (CBB). Since its inception, GFH raised over US$11 billion of investments. The bank carries on its business activities in accordance with the principles of Islamic Sharia, including financial services investment and commercial transaction, negotiable financial instrument, real estate and infrastructure; in addition to structured finance, securities and liquidity management designed to achieve profitable returns for investors.

GFH was transferred to a Public Shareholding Company in 2004 with its shares being listed on the Bahrain Stock Exchange, Kuwait Stock Exchange and Dubai Financial Market. In 2007, GFH listed its GDR’s on the London Stock Exchange.

In November 2014, GFH released a new identity when it moved from being an investment bank to a financial group. The new name for the group was GFH Financial Group.

Services
GFH's business lines cover aspects of financial services from financial and investments to commercial banking operations. GFH's range of activities are Real Estate Development, Commercial Banking, Wealth Management and Asset Management. GFH splits its asset management activities into two areas: Corporate Investment and Real Estate Investment.

GFH major investments

Real estate development projects
Royal Ranches Marrakech
Energy City Qatar
GFH Mumbai Economic Development Zone
Energy City Libya
Tunis Financial Harbor
Bahrain Financial Harbour

Corporate investment projects
Khaleeji Commercial Bank (KHCB)
Philadelphia Private School, Dubai
Leeds United Football Club
Cemena Investment Company
Al Basha’er GCC Equity Fund
Injazat Technology Fund

Real estate investment
Diversified US Residential Portfolio, USA
42 Queens Gate Gardens
UK and Gulf Atlantic Real Estate, UK
SQ Asset Management, USA

See also

List of banks in Bahrain

References

Banks of Bahrain
Islamic banks
Investment banks
Companies listed on the Dubai Financial Market
Companies listed on the Bahrain Bourse
Companies based in Manama